Allen Michael Doyle (born July 26, 1948) is an American professional golfer who played on the Nike Tour, PGA Tour, and Champions Tour.

Life and career
Doyle was born in Woonsocket, Rhode Island and raised in the Boston suburb of Norwood, Massachusetts. He attended Catholic Memorial High School in West Roxbury, Massachusetts, and Norwich University in Vermont where he hosts an annual golf tournament to benefit the Norwich Hockey Team. Despite winning numerous amateur titles, he did not turn professional until he was 46. In 1995, his first full professional season, he won three times on the Nike Tour.

From 1996 to 1998 Doyle competed in 58 PGA Tour events, making the cut in 31, including two top-10 finishes. 

Doyle became eligible to play on the Senior PGA Tour when he turned 50 in July 1998 and won four official money events in 1999, including the Senior PGA Championship. In 2001 he won his second senior major, the Senior Players Championship, and led the tour on the money list. In 2005 he claimed a third major at the U.S. Senior Open, coming behind from a nine stroke deficit with a 63 in the final round. He successfully defended his U.S. Senior Open title in 2006 by defeating Tom Watson at Prairie Dunes Country Club and becoming the oldest U.S. Senior Open Champion at 57 years, 11 months and 17 days. His career earnings on the Champions Tour at the time of his retirement is listed as $13,401,250.

Doyle is a member of the Georgia Sports Hall of Fame and the Georgia Golf Hall of Fame. He owns and operates The Doyle Golf Center driving range in La Grange, Georgia. As a philanthropist, Doyle has donated over 1 million dollars to various charities including family members of slain rescuers of the 9/11 attacks.

Amateur wins (23)
1978 Georgia Amateur
1979 Georgia Amateur
1982 Georgia Amateur
1984 Georgia Mid-Amateur
1986 Georgia Mid-Amateur
1987 Georgia Amateur, Georgia Mid-Amateur
1988 Georgia Amateur, Georgia Mid-Amateur, Rice Planters Amateur
1989 Sunnehanna Amateur, Georgia Mid-Amateur
1990 Sunnehanna Amateur, Georgia Amateur, Rice Planters Amateur
1991 Cardinal Amateur
1992 Sunnehanna Amateur
1993 Northeast Amateur
1994 Dogwood Invitational, Sunnehanna Amateur, Porter Cup, Cardinal Amateur, Rice Planters Amateur

Professional wins (19)

Nike Tour wins (3)

Nike Tour playoff record (2–0)

Champions Tour wins (11)

*Note: Tournament shortened to 36 holes due to weather.

Champions Tour playoff record (3–2)

Other senior wins (5)
1999 Senior Slam
2001 Senior Slam, Hyundai Team Matches (with Dana Quigley)
2002 Hyundai Team Matches (with Dana Quigley)
2017 Bass Pro Shops Legends of Golf – Legends Division (with Hubert Green)

Results in major championships

CUT = missed the halfway cut
Note: Allen only played in the U.S. Open.

Senior major championships

Wins (4)

Results timeline
Results not in chronological order before 2012.

CUT = missed the halfway cut
"T" indicates a tie for a place
Note: Allen never played in The Senior Open Championship.

U.S. national team appearances
Amateur
Eisenhower Trophy: 1990, 1992, 1994 (team winners and individual leader)
Walker Cup: 1989 (injured, did not play), 1991 (winners), 1993 (winners)

See also
1995 Nike Tour graduates
1996 PGA Tour Qualifying School graduates
List of golfers with most Champions Tour major championship wins
List of golfers with most Champions Tour wins
Champions Tour awards

References

External links

American male golfers
PGA Tour golfers
PGA Tour Champions golfers
Winners of senior major golf championships
Korn Ferry Tour graduates
Golfers from Rhode Island
Golfers from Massachusetts
Golfers from Georgia (U.S. state)
Norwich University alumni
Catholic Memorial School alumni
People from Woonsocket, Rhode Island
People from Norwood, Massachusetts
People from Troup County, Georgia
1948 births
Living people